United Nations Security Council Resolution 93, adopted on May 18, 1951, after hearing a report from the Chief of Staff of the United Nations Truce Supervision Organization in Palestine, the representatives of Egypt and Israel as well as a determination by the Egyptian-Israel Mixed Armistice Commission that determined that a “prearranged and planned attack ordered by Israel authorities” was “committed by Israel regular army forces against the Egyptian regular army” in the Gaza Strip on February 28, 1951.  The Council condemned this attack as a violation of the cease-fire previsions of UNSC Resolution 54 and as inconsistent with the obligations of the parties under the General Armistice Agreement between Egypt and Israel and under the United Nations Charter.  The Council again called upon Israel to take all necessary measures to prevent such actions and expressed its conviction that the maintenance of the General Armistice Agreement is threatened by any deliberate violation of it and that no progress towards the return of peace in Palestine can be made until both parties comply strictly with their obligations.

The resolution was adopted with ten votes; the Soviet Union abstained.

See also
 List of United Nations Security Council Resolutions 1 to 100 (1946–1953)

References
Text of the Resolution at undocs.org

External links
 

 0093
 0093

1951 in Egypt
 0093
1951 in Israel
May 1951 events